"Happy When It Rains" is a song by Scottish alternative rock group the Jesus and Mary Chain, released as the second single from their second studio album, Darklands (1987). It was issued through Blanco y Negro Records on 3 August 1987 and reached number 25 on the UK Singles Chart. It was released across three different formats; the 10-inch single is labelled as an extended play (EP).

Track listing
All tracks were written by Jim Reid and William Reid.

7-inch single (NEG25)
A. "Happy When It Rains"
B. "Everything's Alright When You're Down"

7-inch limited-edition single (NEG25B)
A1. "Happy When It Rains" (long version)3
B1. "Everything's Alright When You're Down"
B2. "Shake"

10-inch EP (NEG 25TE)
A1. "Happy When It Rains" (long version)
A2. "Shake"
B1. "Everything's Alright When You're Down"
B2. "Happy When It Rains" (demo)

12-inch single (NEG 25T)
A1. "Happy When It Rains" (long version)
B1. "Shake"
B2. "Happy Place"
B3. "F-Hole"

Personnel
The Jesus and Mary Chain
 Jim Reid – vocals, guitar
 William Reid – guitar, production

Additional personnel
 Bill Price – production ("Happy When It Rains")
 John Loder – production ("Shake", "Everything's Alright When You're Down"), backing vocals ("Everything's Alright When You're Down")
 Linda Reid – design
 Helen Backhouse – design

Charts

References

The Jesus and Mary Chain songs
1987 singles
1987 songs
Blanco y Negro Records singles
Songs written by Jim Reid
Songs written by William Reid (musician)